John Cominsky (born November 22, 1995) is an American football defensive end for the Detroit Lions of the National Football League (NFL). He played college football at Charleston and was drafted by the Atlanta Falcons in the fourth round of the 2019 NFL Draft.

Professional career

Atlanta Falcons
Cominsky was drafted by the Atlanta Falcons in the fourth round (135th overall) of the 2019 NFL Draft. He played in 10 games as a rookie, recording 10 tackles and 0.5 sacks.

Cominsky was placed on the reserve/COVID-19 list by the Falcons on October 17, 2020, and was activated on October 30.

In Week 12 against the Las Vegas Raiders, Cominsky recorded his first career sack on Derek Carr during the 43–6 win.

On May 26, 2022, Cominsky was released by the Falcons.

Detroit Lions
On May 31, 2022, Cominsky was claimed off of waivers by the Detroit Lions. He played in 14 games with eight starts, recording 30 tackles, four sacks, and three passes defensed.

On March 15, 2023, Cominsky signed a two-year, $8.5 million contract extension with the Lions.

References

External links
Charleston Golden Eagles football bio

1995 births
Living people
American football defensive ends
Atlanta Falcons players
Charleston Golden Eagles football players
Detroit Lions players
People from Barberton, Ohio
Players of American football from Ohio